The Shestakovskaya Svita is a geological formation in Mongolia and eastern Russia whose strata date back to the Early Cretaceous. Dinosaur remains are among the fossils that have been recovered from the formation.

Vertebrate paleofauna
 ?Tyrannosauridae indet. 
 Troodontidae indet. 
 Dromaeosauridae indet. 
 Titanosauria indet. 
 Avialae indet. 
 Psittacosaurus mongoliensis 
 Psittacosaurus cf xinjiangensis 
 Psittacosaurus sibiricus

See also 

 List of dinosaur-bearing rock formations

References 

Geologic formations of Mongolia
Geologic formations of Russia
Lower Cretaceous Series of Asia
Cretaceous Russia
Paleontology in Mongolia
Paleontology in Russia